American singer Jennette McCurdy has released one studio album, two extended plays, and four singles. McCurdy debuted as a country music artist with her independent single "So Close" in March 2009. Her second independent single, a cover of Amanda Stott's "Homeless Heart", was released in May 2009.

After gaining attention of multiple record labels, McCurdy ultimately signed to Capitol Records Nashville in June 2009 and begun writing songs for her debut album. Her debut single, "Not That Far Away", was released in May 2010, debuting and peaking at number 58 on the U.S. Billboard Hot Country Songs chart. Her debut extended play, Not That Far Away, was released on August 17, 2010. It debuted and peaked at number 32 on the Billboard Top Country Albums and number 3 on Billboard Top Heatseekers.

In March 2011, her second major label and most recent single, "Generation Love", was released digitally. Embarking on the "Generation Love for St. Jude" mall tour, McCurdy traveled to and performed at multiple different malls within the United States. All proceeds from the event went towards St. Jude Children's Research Hospital. The single was later sent to radio in April 2011, peaking at number 44 on the Billboard Hot Country Songs chart. McCurdy's debut studio album was planned to be released later that year, but was delayed to early 2012.

In January 2012, "Generation Love" was included on the iCarly soundtrack album, iSoundtrack II. Capitol Nashville announced that same month that McCurdy's eponymous second extended play would be released exclusively to Justice stores later that month to promote her upcoming album, but was delayed until February 8, 2012. Her full ten-track eponymous debut studio album was released later that year in June 2012 and is her most recent release. Both her eponymous extended play and studio album were commercial failures. Shortly after her album release, McCurdy left Capitol Nashville due to conflicts with other projects.

Studio albums

Extended plays

Singles

Music videos

References 

Discographies of American artists
Country music discographies